Kukarail is a left-bank small tributary of the Gomti River which merges with it in Lucknow, Uttar Pradesh.

Rivers of Uttar Pradesh
Rivers of India